Quentin C. Aanenson (April 21, 1921 – December 28, 2008) was a World War II veteran fighter pilot and former captain of the 391st Fighter Squadron, 366th Fighter Group, 9th Air Force, Army Air Forces. He flew the P-47 Thunderbolt in the Normandy D-Day invasion and subsequent European campaign.

Life

He was originally from Luverne, Minnesota.

Aanenson enlisted in the U.S. Army Air Forces in 1942 but was not called up to active duty until February 1943. He left for Santa Ana Air Force Base for pre-flight training and then to Primary Flight School at Thunderbird Field near Phoenix, Arizona. In September 1943, he attended Basic Flight School at Gardner Field near Bakersfield, California. Aanenson then received Advanced Flight Training at Luke Field, Phoenix, Arizona where he was commissioned a second lieutenant on January 7, 1944. From January to May 1944, he trained at Harding Field in Baton Rouge, Louisiana where he met his wife Jackie.

Aanenson demonstrated exceptional courage and ability as a fighter pilot, amassing tens of kills and beating all odds to survive the early months of his tour of duty. Later in the war, Aanenson was taken out of the cockpit and embedded with advance troops, with his skills put to good use as a quick-response aircraft attack coordinator. He eventually documented his experiences for his family. This was later turned into a documentary video, A Fighter Pilot's Story, which Aanenson wrote, produced and narrated. The film was first televised in late 1993, then broadcast on over 300 public television stations in June 1994. Until August 2007, it was available for purchase on DVD. The three-hour documentary, tells of an enthusiastic and cheery boy very rapidly aged by too much death. It also tells of a remarkably wide range of combat duties and details many harrowing individual missions. In one such mission, Aanenson and his wingman came upon and destroyed a German convoy, but the wingman's gun had jammed. Aanenson fired upon roadside ditches where German soldiers had hidden, making multiple passes and "walking" his rudder to spread his fire more effectively and leave as few survivors as possible.

The documentary also tells of a remarkable coincidence, in which Aanenson's P-47 was called down to assist some American troops under attack by a tank. He surveyed the scene, then reported to the troops that the tank was too close to them for him to fire upon it without risking injury to the Americans. However, since the soldiers were sure to be killed if the tank wasn't stopped, Aanenson decided to attack, and he managed to destroy the tank cleanly. About two years after the war, Aanenson met a new neighbor who started to recount the story.  About halfway through, Aanenson finished the memorable event for him, and for a time they both shared in the emotion of the event.

Aanenson was a Commander of the French Legion of Honor, representing all Americans who served in France. He was also featured in the documentary The War by Ken Burns, recounting his experiences during World War II as a fighter pilot. At the conclusion of Episode Five of the series, Aanenson narrated a poignant and ominous letter he had written to his future wife but had never sent, considered by some critics to be of similar style to the Sullivan Ballou letter in Burns' The Civil War. Written December 5, 1944, the letter reads:

According to the PBS website, Quentin and Jackie married after the war and had three children and eight grandchildren, with Aanenson working in the insurance field after graduating from Louisiana State University.

Aanenson died from cancer at his home in Bethesda, Maryland on December 28, 2008. He was buried with full military honors at Arlington National Cemetery.

Tributes

The painting Thunderbolt Patriot by William R. Farrell, now in the permanent collection of the Smithsonian Institution of the National Air and Space Museum, depicts Aanenson having just returned from a combat mission over Germany during World War II.

The airfield at Luverne Municipal Airport (KLYV) was named Quentin Aanenson Field in his honor.

References

 Official website of Quentin C. Aanenson DVD still available as of Jan 2016.
Star Tribune obituary
 Drury University: A Fighter Pilot's Story
 Biography

External links
 Smithsonian Center for Folklife and Cultural Heritage, Wartime Stories
 World War II photos of Aanenson

1921 births
2008 deaths
People from Luverne, Minnesota
United States Army Air Forces officers
United States Army Air Forces pilots of World War II
American World War II flying aces
Burials at Arlington National Cemetery
Military personnel from Minnesota